The 2019 Bronx Open was a professional tennis tournament played on hard courts. It was the 18th edition of the Bronx Open, and first edition as part of the WTA International tournaments of the 2019 WTA Tour. It took place at the Cary Leeds Center in Crotona Park in The Bronx, New York City, United States from 18 to 24 August 2019.

This tournament replaced the Tournoi de Québec on the WTA Tour. The Connecticut Open, which was a WTA Premier event formerly scheduled for the week before the US Open, was replaced by the Zhengzhou Open.

Points and prize money

Point distribution

Prize money

Singles main draw entrants

Seeds

 Rankings as of August 12, 2019.

Other entrants
The following players received wildcards into the singles main draw:
  Kristie Ahn
  Bernarda Pera 
  CoCo Vandeweghe
 
The following players received entry from the qualifying draw:
  Fiona Ferro
  Kaia Kanepi
  Magda Linette
  Anastasia Potapova 
  Jil Teichmann
  Zhu Lin

The following players received entry as lucky losers:
  Anna Blinkova
  Viktorija Golubic
  Laura Siegemund

Withdrawals
  Danielle Collins → replaced by  Veronika Kudermetova
  Anna-Lena Friedsam → replaced by  Wang Yafan
  Johanna Konta → replaced by  Karolína Muchová
  Anett Kontaveit → replaced by  Margarita Gasparyan
  Maria Sakkari → replaced by  Kateryna Kozlova
  Carla Suárez Navarro → replaced by  Viktorija Golubic
  Ajla Tomljanović → replaced by  Anna Blinkova
  Dayana Yastremska → replaced by  Alison Van Uytvanck
  Zheng Saisai → replaced by  Laura Siegemund

Retirements
  Anastasia Potapova (breathing difficulty)
  Zhu Lin (left leg injury)

Doubles main draw entrants

Seeds

1 Rankings as of August 12, 2019

Other entrants 
The following pairs received wildcards into the doubles main draw:
  Kristie Ahn /  Vania King  
  Hsieh Su-wei /  Hsieh Yu-chieh

Champions

Singles

  Magda Linette def.  Camila Giorgi, 5–7, 7–5, 6–4

Doubles

  Darija Jurak /  María José Martínez Sánchez def.  Margarita Gasparyan /  Monica Niculescu, 7–5, 2–6, [10–7]

References

External links
Official website

2019
Bronx Open
Bronx Open
2019 in American tennis
August 2019 sports events in the United States